Barbara Roach (née Joscelyne, born 9 May 1959 in Bishop's Stortford, England) is a British Paralympian athlete. In the 1980 Summer Paralympics she won the gold medal in the E category 100m, 400 metres, and long jump. In 1984, competing in the A6 category, she won the gold medal in discus and a silver medal for the 100m and shot put.

She married Roy Roach in 1990 and went on to having three children: Katharine, Helen and Patrick.

She currently works at the Hertfordshire and Essex High School and Science College in Bishop's Stortford, Hertfordshire.

References

External links
 

1959 births
Living people
English people with disabilities
British disabled sportspeople
Track and field athletes with disabilities
Amputee category Paralympic competitors
Sportswomen with disabilities
English female shot putters
English female discus throwers
English female sprinters
British female shot putters
British female discus throwers
British female sprinters
Paralympic athletes of Great Britain
Paralympic gold medalists for Great Britain
Paralympic silver medalists for Great Britain
Athletes (track and field) at the 1980 Summer Paralympics
Athletes (track and field) at the 1984 Summer Paralympics
Medalists at the 1980 Summer Paralympics
Medalists at the 1984 Summer Paralympics
People from Bishop's Stortford
Paralympic medalists in athletics (track and field)